Moechotypa javana is a species of beetle in the family Cerambycidae. It was described by Schwarzer in 1929. It is known from Java.

References

javana
Beetles described in 1929